Jutta Bornemann (October 26, 1920 – January 20, 1999) was an Austrian actress and writer.

Selected filmography

Screenwriter
 The Mine Foreman (1952)
 Ideal Woman Sought (1952)
 The Emperor Waltz (1953)
 Dark Clouds Over the Dachstein (1953)
 Emperor's Ball (1956)

Actress
 Gateway to Peace (1951)
 Roses from the South (1954)
 The Song of Kaprun (1955)

References

Bibliography
 Robert Dassanowsky. Austrian Cinema: A History. McFarland, 2005.

External links

1920 births
1999 deaths
Austrian film actresses
Actresses from Vienna
20th-century Austrian screenwriters